Salvatore "Sally Bugs" Briguglio (February 4, 1930 - March 21, 1978) was a former Italian-American mobster and hitman for the Genovese crime family, and business agent for Local 560 for the Teamsters. He is known for being one of the prime suspects in the disappearance of Jimmy Hoffa. Briguglio was also known for being a ruthless killer; he is reported to have killed over 50 people for the Genovese crime family, in some cases torturing his victims.

Early life
Briguglio was born on February 4, 1930, at 406 Palisade Avenue in Union City, New Jersey. Briguglio served with the U.S. Army during the Korean War.

Time in the mafia
Briguglio was a loanshark and hitman who served as a lieutenant to Anthony Provenzano. He allegedly killed over 50 people for the Genovese crime family. Briguglio allegedly tortured and murdered Anthony Castellitto on the orders of Provenzano, due to Castellitto getting more votes than him, Briguglio transported the body of Castellitto back to New Jersey and dismembered his body in a woodchipper. In June 1976, Briguglio was indicted, along with Provenzano and another murder associate in the Castellitto murder.

Involvement in the disappearance of Jimmy Hoffa
Briguglio is one of the top suspects in the disappearance of Jimmy Hoffa. Some experts think that Briguglio murdered Hoffa. One FBI theory indicates that Briguglio was one of the men who Hoffa met the day he vanished under the pretense that Hoffa was going to resolve his feud with Provenzano. A statement from FBI informant Ralph Picardo said that he was a driver for Provenzano, and that Hoffa was invited to a meeting by Anthony Giacalone. Chuckie O'Brien picked up Hoffa at a restaurant and drove him to a nearby house where Thomas Andretta, Briguglio, and his brother, Gabriel Briguglio waited to ambush Hoffa. Picardo also stated that Frank Sheeran was also present. Briguglio, and everyone accused, were the prime suspects for Hoffa's disappearance.

Death 
On March 21, 1978, two gunmen knocked Briguglio down and shot him four times in the face and chest as he sprawled on the sidewalk in front of the Andrea Doria Social Club in Little Italy, Manhattan. Witnesses say that the two gunmen ran north and got into a light blue Ford Mercury with New Jersey license plates and drove off.

In popular culture 
He is portrayed by Louis Cancelmi in the movie The Irishman.

References 

1930 births
1978 deaths
Genovese crime family
People murdered by American organized crime
People charged with murder
American gangsters of Italian descent
Murdered American gangsters of Italian descent
Deaths by firearm in Manhattan